The 1952 NASCAR Speedway Division consisted of seven races, beginning in Darlington, South Carolina on May 10 and concluding in Langhorne, Pennsylvania on June 29.  There was also one non-championship event in Daytona Beach, Florida.  The season champion was Buck Baker.  This was the first season of the NASCAR Speedway Division. Every driver was an American racecar driver and every race was in the USA.

Schedule

Final points standings

See also
1952 in NASCAR
1952 AAA Championship Car season

References
 
 
 
 
 

Speedway Division
NASCAR Speedway Division
NASCAR Speedway Division